The Linares Baeza–Almería railway is an Iberian-gauge railway line in Spain. It branches from the Alcázar de San Juan–Cádiz railway at Linares and terminates in Almería. It is currently the main line linking Madrid to Almería.

Route
The line runs through the provinces of Jaén, Granada and Almería. The route formerly contained the Hacho Bridge, which was the longest iron viaduct on the Spanish rail network.

Services
The line is used by all trains from Almería to Madrid, with the full journey taking around six hours. To continue to Madrid from Linares, the line uses the Alcázar de San Juan–Cádiz railway as far as Alcázar de San Juan, and the Madrid–Valencia railway to Madrid Chamartín.

Future
In 2023, Almería railway station will be linked to the AVE high-speed rail network by the Murcia–Almería high-speed rail line, allowing a 3.5 hour journey to Madrid, compared to over six hours using the Linares Baeza–Almería railway, which will therefore decrease in importance.

References

Rail transport in Andalusia
Railway lines in Spain
Iberian gauge railways